Lohengrin Filipello (c. 1918 – 29 December 1993) was a Swiss television presenter.

Biography
Filipello would commentate on behalf of SRG SSR, the main Swiss broadcaster during the 1950s and 1960s, and has made several involvements, such as creating new ideas of shows to broadcast on television, commentating on then-current events, and editing footage before broadcast, among others.

In 1956, Filipello had the honour of hosting the  staged in Lugano, Switzerland. Filipello also has the distinction as the only man who has hosted the contest by himself, as of the 2021 contest. Filipello was also later involved with Eurovision, he hosted the Swiss National final in 1961 and 1967 respectively.

Filipello died in 1993.

See also
List of Eurovision Song Contest presenters

References

External links

1910s births
1993 deaths
Swiss television presenters
Swiss-Italian people